ORF Sport + is an Austrian sports channel owned by the public service broadcaster, ORF. The channel is available via satellite Astra 1KR, on 19.2°E, cable and DVB-T, in Austria and parts of Europe.

History
Before the launch of ORF Sport Plus on 1 May 2006, TW1 provided sports programming since May 2000 up until the launch of ORF Sport Plus.

On 22 October 2007, ORF Sport Plus was made available to DVB-T, only in the state capitals of Austria. Since that date, TW1 was available only on cable and satellite.

On July 15, 2009, ORF Information Director Elmar Oberhauser announced that the channel would be discontinued in 2010 for cost reasons. However, the ORF law secured the program and it is to be expanded.

On October 26, 2011, ORF SPORT + was expanded into a 24-hour special interest channel. The channel took over the antenna frequency previously shared with Hitradio Ö3 TV and received new satellite and cable slots.

A high definition (HD) version of the channel was announced for October 24, 2014.

Programming
ORF Sport + shows a variety of sport programming including; Formula E, American football, ice hockey, football, hockey, badminton, tennis, table tennis, volleyball, team handball, swimming, and the National Golf Championships.

Logos

References

External links
ORF Sport
ORF Sport Plus TV listings

ORF (broadcaster)
Television stations in Austria
Television channels and stations established in 2006
2006 establishments in Austria
Sports television in Austria